The 2010 GCC U-23 Championship was the second edition of the GCC U-23 Championship. It took place in Doha, Qatar for the first time. Six nations took part. The competition was held in Doha from 28 July to 7 August 2010. United Arab Emirates won their first title after defeating Kuwait 1–0 in the final.

United Arab Emirates made their debut in the competition and won their first title. The format of the competition was changed to include a knockout round.

Teams
{| class="wikitable sortable"
|-
! Team
! data-sort-type="number"|Previous appearances in tournament
|-
|  || 1 (2008)
|-
|  || 1 (2008)
|-
|  (host) || 1 (2008)
|-
|   || 1 (2008)
|-
|  || 1 (2008)
|-
|   || 0 (debut)
|}

Venues

Group stage

Group A

Since both Qatar and Bahrain finished level on points, goal difference and goals scored, a penalty shootout was held to determine who finishes in second.

Group B

Knockout stage
In the knockout stage, extra time and penalty shoot-out were be used to decide the winner if necessary (Regulations Articles 10.1 and 10.3).

Bracket

Fifth place play-off

Semi-finals

Third place play-off

Final

Winners

Awards
The following awards were given at the conclusion of the tournament:

Goalscorers

See also 
Arabian Gulf Cup
Arab Gulf Cup Football Federation

References

External links
UAFA Official Website
GCC U-23 Championship at Goalzz

GCC U-23 Championship
2010
2010 in Asian football
2010–11 in Qatari football
2010–11 in Saudi Arabian football
2010–11 in Bahraini football
2010–11 in Omani football
2010–11 in Kuwaiti football
2010–11 in Emirati football
2010 in youth association football